Kim Un-ju ( or  ; born 6 June 1992) is a North Korean female international football player.

International goals

Under-19

National team

External links 
 
 

1992 births
Living people
North Korean women's footballers
North Korea women's international footballers
Women's association football midfielders